Antonius Franciscus "Toon" Pastor (10 January 1929 – 28 June 2008) was a boxer from the Netherlands, who competed at the 1952 Summer Olympics in Helsinki, Finland. There he lost on points (1–2) in the second round of the light heavyweight (– 81 kg) division to Karl Kistner of Germany. He was born in Amsterdam.

References

1929 births
2008 deaths
Light-heavyweight boxers
Olympic boxers of the Netherlands
Boxers at the 1952 Summer Olympics
Boxers from Amsterdam
Dutch male boxers